Norbert Sorin Niță (born 14 January 1972) is a Romanian football coach and a former player.

References

1972 births
People from Gorj County
Living people
Romanian footballers
Association football defenders
FCV Farul Constanța players
FC Elista players
Russian Premier League players
Romanian expatriate footballers
Expatriate footballers in Russia
Romanian expatriate sportspeople in Russia